The Annals of Applied Probability is a leading peer-reviewed mathematics journal published by the Institute of Mathematical Statistics, which is the main international society for researchers in probability and
statistics. The journal was established in 1991 by founding editor J. Michael Steele and is indexed by Mathematical Reviews and Zentralblatt MATH. Its 2009 MCQ was 1.02. Its impact factor (measured by JCR/ISI-Thomson) evolved from 1.454 in 2014 to 1.786 in 2017.

The journal CiteScore is 3.2 and its SCImago Journal Rank is 1.878, both from 2020. It is currently ranked 9th in the field of Probability & Statistics with Applications according to Google Scholar.

References

External links

Probability journals
Publications established in 1991
English-language journals
Bimonthly journals
Institute of Mathematical Statistics academic journals
1991 establishments in the United States